Gemini (also known as Sōseiji; ,  "Twins") is a 1999 horror film by Shinya Tsukamoto, loosely based on an Edogawa Ranpo story, which pursues his theme of the brutally physical and animalistic side of human beings rearing its ugly head underneath a civilized veneer, present in previous films like Tetsuo: The Iron Man (1989) and Tokyo Fist (1995), in what is a new territory for Tsukamoto—a story set in the late Meiji era (1868–1912) with no stop-motion photography and no industrial setting.

Plot

Tokyo. 1910. Dr. Daitokuji Yukio (Masahiro Motoki), a former military doctor who has taken over a successful practice from his father and treats plague victims, is living a charmed life: he is a respected young doctor with a successful practice and Rin (Ryo), a beautiful wife. His only problem is that she suffers from amnesia, and her past is unknown.

However, things begin to fall apart. Both his parents die suddenly, killed by a mysterious stranger who looks just like him. His relationship with his wife worsens after he chooses to cure the mayor instead of destitute denizens of nearby ghettos. While isolated from his relatives, he one day faces the mysterious stranger who turns out to be his long-lost rejected twin, Sutekichi (again Motoki). Bent on revenge, Sutekichi throws him into the garden's well and takes over his life and his wife.

The final conflict between the two brothers is realized when Yukio, forced into an animalistic existence in the well, reemerges, prompting the fratricidal fight for the love of the same woman, since it turns out (while he takes over Yukio's role) that Rin had actually once been Sutekichi's lover.

Cast
 Masahiro Motoki – Yukio Daitokuji / Sutekichi
 Ryo – Rin
 Yasutaka Tsutsui – Yukio's father
 Shiho Fujimura – Yukio's mother
 Akaji Maro – Kakubê
 Masako Motai – Shige
 Renji Ishibashi – Beggar monk
 Tomorowo Taguchi – Middle-aged patient
 Tadanobu Asano – Revenger with sword
 Naoto Takenaka – Rich man

Documentary
A behind-the-scenes documentary about the making of Gemini was produced and directed by Takashi Miike. The documentary, titled Tsukamoto Shinya ga Ranpo suru, is 17 minutes long.

Release
Gemini received its official world premiere at the Venice Film Festival in 1999. It was released a few days later in Japan on September 15, 1999 where it was distributed by Toho. It was shown in the United States on November 5, 2000 at the Hawaii Film Festival. It has also received a rerelease by Third Window Films on Blu-ray in 2020.

Reception
Variety gave the film a generally favourable review, stating that "this strikingly designed thriller is gripping despite a certain heavy-handedness and the director's customarily chaotic narrative approach." The Globe and Mail referred to Gemini as the "Pick of the Day" from its presentation at the Toronto International Film Festival, describing the film as "disconcerting, opaque, energetic, tedious, fascinating and flat-out insane in roughly equal measure" A review in the French film magazine Positif stated that Gemini had an awkward style that would leave viewers unable to get a real sense of fear and that the film had the complexity of a student film or a z-grade series. Contrarily, the media site Grimoire of Horror praised the frantic narrative for "absolutely breath taking plot twists, scenes of highly choreographed mayhem, beautifully erotic sequences, in-your-face class divide parables".

See also
 List of Japanese films of 1999

References

Footnotes

Sources

External links
 
 
 

1999 horror films
1999 films
1990s psychological thriller films
Japanese horror films
Films directed by Shinya Tsukamoto
Films based on works by Edogawa Ranpo
Films scored by Chu Ishikawa
Films about twin brothers
Films set in 1910
Toho films
Films set in Tokyo
Japanese psychological horror films
1990s Japanese films